In biological classification, circumscriptional names are taxon names that are not ruled by ICZN and are defined by the particular set of members included. Circumscriptional names are used mainly for taxa above family-group level (e. g. order or class), but can be also used for taxa of any ranks, as well as for rank-less taxa.

Non-typified names other than those of the genus- or species-group constitute the majority of generally accepted names of taxa higher than superfamily. The ICZN regulates names of taxa up to family group rank (i. e. superfamily). There are no generally accepted rules of naming higher taxa (orders, classes, phyla, etc.). Under the approach of circumscription-based (circumscriptional) nomenclatures, a circumscriptional name is associated with a certain circumscription of a taxon without regard of its rank or position. 

Some authors advocate introducing a mandatory standardized typified nomenclature of higher taxa. They suggest all names of higher taxa to be derived in the same manner as family-group names, i.e. by modifying names of type genera with endings to reflect the rank. There is no consensus on what such higher rank endings should be. A number of established practices exist as to the use of typified names of higher taxa, depending on animal group.

See also
 Descriptive botanical name, optional forms still used in botany for ranks above family and for a few family names

References

 Kluge, N. 2000. "Sovremennaya Sistematika Nasekomyh ..." [Modern Systematics of Insects. Part I. Principles of Systematics of Living Organisms and General System of Insects, with Classification of Primary Wingless and Paleopterous Insects] - S.-Petersburg, Lan', 2000, 333 pp.; (c) N.Ju. Kluge, 2000; (c) "Lan'", 2000.
 Kluge N.J. 2010. Circumscriptional names of higher taxa in Hexapoda. // Bionomina, 1: 15–55.   http://www.mapress.com/bionomina/content/2010/f/bn00001p055.pdf

External links
 Kluge's PRINCIPLES OF NOMENCLATURE of ZOOLOGICAL TAXA 
 NOMINA CIRCUMSCRIBENTIA INSECTORUM

Biological classification